The Great Seal of Scotland is a principal national symbol of Scotland that allows the monarch to authorise official documents without having to sign each document individually. Wax is melted in a metal mould or matrix and impressed into a wax figure that is attached by cord or ribbon to documents that the monarch wishes to make official. The earliest seal impression, in the Treasury of Durham Cathedral, is believed to be the Great Seal of Duncan II and dates to 1094.

The current keeper of the Great Seal of Scotland is the First Minister of Scotland and it is considered as one of the highest honours of that office.

History
The chancellor had the custody of the King's Seal. 

Strictly, the continuation of the Great Seal of Scotland was guaranteed by the Treaty of Union which provided that "a Seal in Scotland after the Union be alwayes kept and made use of in all things relating to private Rights or Grants, which have usually passed the Great Seal of Scotland, and which only concern Offices, Grants, Commissions, and private Rights within that Kingdom". Hence, the Scotland Act 1998 refers to the current seal as "the seal appointed by the Treaty of Union to be kept and made use of in place of the Great Seal of Scotland". Nevertheless, the seal is still commonly referred to as the Great Seal of Scotland.

Section 12 of the Treason Act 1708, still in force today, makes it treason in Scotland to counterfeit the seal.

The design of the Great Seal is a responsibility of the Lord Lyon King of Arms. The reverse of the seal shows the monarch on horseback, but is not changed from reign to reign—the current version is that engraved in 1911 for the accession of King George V. The obverse is inscribed "ELIZABETH II D G BRITT REGNORVMQVE SVORVM CETER REGINA CONSORTIONIS POPULORUM PRINCEPS F D" and the figure on it is the same as on the Great Seal of the United Kingdom.

The Great Seal is administered by the keeper of the Great Seal, one of the Great Officers of State. From 1885 this office was held by the secretary for Scotland, later the Secretary of State for Scotland. It transferred in 1999 to the first minister of Scotland, whose place in the order of precedence in Scotland is determined by his or her office as keeper of the Great Seal. In practice the Seal is in the custody of the keeper of the Registers of Scotland, who has been appointed as deputy keeper.

Great Seal of the Kingdom of Scotland

1389–96: Sir Alexander de Cockburn
Date unknown (c. 1473): Alexander de Cockburn
1474–1483 John Laing Bishop of Glasgow
1514: Gavin Douglas, Bishop of Dunkeld
1525: Gavin Dunbar, Bishop of Aberdeen
Date unknown: James Beaton (1473–1539)
Date Unknown: John Lyon, 7th Lord Glamis (c. 1521–1558)
1558: John Lyon, 8th Lord Glamis
1561: George Gordon, 4th Earl of Huntly
1562–1567: Sir Richard Maitland
...
1635–1638: John Spottiswoode, Archbishop of St. Andrews
1638–1641: James, Marquis of Hamilton
1641–1660: John Campbell, 1st Earl of Loudoun
1657–1660: Samuel Disbrowe (for the Commonwealth)
Date unknown: Sir Adam Forrester
Date unknown: Sir John Forrester

Great Seal of Scotland (1707–present)

1708: Hugh Campbell, 3rd Earl of Loudoun
1713: James Ogilvy, 4th Earl of Findlater, 1st Earl of Seafield
1714: William Johnstone, 1st Marquess of Annandale
1716: James Graham, 1st Duke of Montrose
1733: Archibald Campbell, 1st Earl of Islay
1761: Charles Douglas, 3rd Duke of Queensberry, 2nd Duke of Dover
1763: James Murray, 2nd Duke of Atholl
1764: Hugh Hume-Campbell, 3rd Earl of Marchmont
1794: Alexander Gordon, 4th Duke of Gordon
1806: James Maitland, 8th Earl of Lauderdale
1807: Alexander Gordon, 4th Duke of Gordon
1827: George William Campbell, 6th Duke of Argyll
1828: George Gordon, 5th Duke of Gordon
1830: George William Campbell, 6th Duke of Argyll
1840: John Hamilton Dalrymple, 8th Earl of Stair
1841: John Douglas Edward Henry Campbell, 7th Duke of Argyll
1846: John Hamilton Dalrymple, 8th Earl of Stair
1852: Dunbar James Douglas, 6th Earl of Selkirk
1853: Cospatrick Alexander Home, 11th Earl of Home
1858: Dunbar James Douglas, 6th Earl of Selkirk

The following are keepers of the Great Seal who served as secretaries for Scotland (1885–1926).

1885: Charles Henry Gordon-Lennox, 6th Duke of Richmond
1886: George Otto Trevelyan
1886: John William Ramsay, 13th Earl of Dalhousie
1886: Arthur Balfour
1887: Schomberg Henry Kerr, 9th Marquess of Lothian
1892: George Otto Trevelyan
1895: Alexander Hugh Bruce, 6th Lord Balfour of Burleigh
1903: Andrew Murray, 1st Viscount Dunedin
1905: John Hope, 1st Marquess of Linlithgow
1905: John Sinclair, 1st Baron Pentland
1912: Thomas McKinnon Wood
1916: Harold Tennant
1916: Robert Munro, 1st Baron Alness
1922: Ronald Munro Ferguson, 1st Viscount Novar
1924: William Adamson
1926: Sir John Gilmour

The following are keepers of the Great Seal who served as secretaries of state for Scotland (1926–1999).

1926: Sir John Gilmour
1929: William Adamson
1931: Sir Archibald Sinclair
1932: Sir Godfrey Collins
1936: Walter Elliot
1938: John Colville
1940: Ernest Brown
1941: Thomas Johnston
1945: Harry Primrose, 6th Earl of Rosebery
1945: Joseph Westwood
1947: Arthur Woodburn
1950: Hector McNeil
1951: James Stuart
1957: John Maclay
1962: Michael Noble
1964: William Ross
1970: Gordon Campbell
1974: William Ross
1976: Bruce Millan
1979: George Younger
1986: Malcolm Rifkind
1990: Ian Lang
1995: Michael Forsyth
1997: Donald Dewar

The office of the Keeper of the Great Seal was transferred on 6 May 1999, to the First Minister, in accordance with the terms of section 45(7) of the Scotland Act 1998.

1999: Donald Dewar
2000: Henry McLeish
2001: Jack McConnell
2007: Alex Salmond
2014: Nicola Sturgeon

Register

Records of charters under the Great Seal of Scotland from 1306 to 1668 are published in the Register of the Great Seal of Scotland (Registrum Magni Sigilli Regum Scotorum).

See also
 Director of Chancery

References

External links
 https://archive.org/stream/registrummagnisi07scot#page/n5/mode/2up

Scotland
Government of Scotland
Political office-holders in Scotland
Lists of Scottish people
Scots law
National symbols of Scotland